Nick Schlee (born 1931) is a British artist. He mainly produces landscape paintings.

Life and work
Schlee was born in Weybridge, Surrey. In 1947, he won Gold and Silver medals for under 18s from the Royal Drawing Society. He matriculated at University College, Oxford in 1952. In 1955, he studied part-time at the Art Students League in New York, United States. The following year he again studied part-time at the Central School of Art and Design, Morley College, Putney Art School, and the Slade School of Fine Art in London.
In 1989, he exhibited at the Royal Academy in London.
He has painted a number of works featuring the River Thames. His work is of "forceful landscapes defined with positive brushstrokes." He produces short books on his artworks.

Since 1989, Nick Schlee has lived and worked in Upper Basildon, Berkshire. He is married to the writer Ann Schlee and has four children.

Exhibitions
Nick Schlee has produced many one man exhibitions in England:

 1987 Yehudi Menuhin School, Sussex
 1988 The Grange, Rottingdean
 1990 Wantage Museum, Oxfordshire
 1991 Century Galleries, Henley-on-Thames
 1992 Flying Colours Gallery, Edinburgh
 1993 Castlegate House Gallery, Cumbria
 1994 Barbican Centre, London
 1995 Wantage Museum, Oxfordshire
 1996 Simon Carter Gallery, Suffolk
 1996 University of Liverpool
 1996 Christ Church Picture Gallery, Oxford
 1998 Gallery 27, London
 2000 Gallery 27, London
 2001 Corn Exchange, Newbury
 2002 Gallery 27, London
 2002 River & Rowing Museum, Henley-on-Thames
 2003 Christ Church Picture Gallery, Oxford
 2004 Modern Artists Gallery, Oxfordshire
 2004 Gallery 27, London
 2006 Oxford Said Business School
 2006 Corn Exchange, Newbury
 2006 Gallery 27, London
 2006 West Berkshire Museum
 2006 Gallery 27, London
 2008 Gallery 27, London
 2010 River & Rowing Museum, Henley-on-Thames
 2012 Modern Artists Gallery, Oxfordshire
 2013 St Barbe Museum & Art Gallery (exhibition produced by the Southampton City Art Gallery)
 2014 Gallery 8, London
 2015 54 The Gallery, London
 2015 Gallery 8, London
 2016 Modern Artists Gallery, Oxfordshire
 2017 Arlington Arts Centre, Newbury
 2017 Oxfordshire County Museum, Woodstock
 2018 Gallery 8, London (Abstractions)
 2018 Christ Church Picture Gallery, Oxford
 2020 Gallery 8, London (Venice Observed)

Collections
Schlee's work is held by the
City of London Guildhall Art Gallery,
Gallery Oldham,
Hampshire County Council,
John Creasey Museum (Salisbury),
University of Liverpool,
National Trust,
Oxfordshire Museums,
University of Portsmouth,
Reading Museum & Art Gallery,
River & Rowing Museum, 
Southampton City Art Gallery,
Swindon Art Gallery,
The Wessex Collection (Longleat),
West Berkshire Museum, and
Wiltshire Heritage Museum.

References

External links

 Nick Schlee Paintings and Drawings website'
 Nick Schlee – Sketching and Painting DVD, Bardon Studios, YouTube

1931 births
Living people
People from Weybridge
Alumni of University College, Oxford
Alumni of the Slade School of Fine Art
Alumni of the Central School of Art and Design
20th-century English painters
21st-century English painters
Artists from Berkshire
English male painters
English landscape artists
20th-century English male artists
21st-century English male artists